Hannette Staack (born February 7, 1979) is a Brazilian submission grappler  and 4th degree Brazilian Jiu-Jitsu (BJJ) black belt practitioner and coach. A three-time ADCC champion and five-time IBJJF World Champion, Staack is a member of the IBJJF Hall of Fame and is regarded as one of the most accomplished female grapplers in the history of the sport.

Biography 
Hannette Quadros Staack was born on 7 February 1979 in São Luís do Maranhão, northern Brazil at the age of two her family moved to Rio de Janeiro. Staack began training jiu-jitsu when she was 18, five years later in 2002, she won her first world championship. Together with her professor and business partner Andre "Negão" Terencio she founded Brazil 021 School of Jiu-Jitsu.
In October 2022, Staack made her professional MMA debut in Rio de Janeiro submitting her opponent in under three minutes.

Championships and accomplishments 
Main Achievements:
 5 x IBJJF World Jiu-Jitsu Champion (2002 / 2004 / 2008 / 2009 / 2011)
 3 x ADCC Submission Fighting World World Champion (2007 / 2009)
 CBJJ Brazilian Nationals Champion (2003 brown)
 2nd place IBJJF World Championship (2006 / 2014)
 2nd place ADCC World Championship (2011)
 2nd place IBJJF World No-Gi Champion (2007)
 3rd place IBJJF World Championship (2005 / 2013)

Mixed martial arts record 

|-
| Win
| align=center| 1–0
| Lorrany Maui
| Submission (Kimura)
| Shooto Brazil 111 - Macapa x Bad Boy
| 
| align=center| 1
| align=center| 2:39
| Rio de Janeiro, Brazil
|
|-

Notes

See also
 List of Brazilian Jiu-Jitsu practitioners

References

External links 
Brazil 021 School of Jiu-Jitsu

1979 births
Living people
People from São Luís, Maranhão
Brazilian practitioners of Brazilian jiu-jitsu
People awarded a black belt in Brazilian jiu-jitsu
Brazilian jiu-jitsu world champions (women)
World No-Gi Brazilian Jiu-Jitsu Championship medalists
IBJJF Hall of Fame inductees
Female Brazilian jiu-jitsu practitioners
Sportspeople from Maranhão
Brazilian jiu-jitsu practitioners who have competed in MMA (women)
ADCC Submission Fighting World Champions (women)